Anthony Robert Gose (born August 10, 1990) is an American professional baseball pitcher and outfielder in the Cleveland Guardians organization. Originally an outfielder, Gose transitioned from a center fielder to a pitcher, following the 2016 season. He has played in Major League Baseball (MLB) for the Toronto Blue Jays, Detroit Tigers, and the Cleveland Indians/Guardians.

Early life
Gose attended Bellflower High School in Bellflower, California. In his senior year, he had a .443 batting average, a .618 on-base percentage, and 31 stolen bases for the school's baseball team. Gose also competed in track and field. He ran the 100 and 200 meter races, and the 4 × 100 and 4 × 400 meter relays. He also attended the Major League Baseball Urban Youth Academy in Compton, California. He received a scholarship to attend the University of Arizona to play college baseball with the Arizona Wildcats.

Career

Philadelphia Phillies
The Philadelphia Phillies drafted Gose in the second round, with the 51st overall selection, of the 2008 Major League Baseball Draft. He opted to sign with the Phillies, forgoing his college scholarship for a $772,000 signing bonus. Playing for the Lakewood BlueClaws of the Class A South Atlantic League (SAL) in 2009, he appeared in the SAL All-Star Game. His 76 stolen bases that season led all of minor league baseball.

Gose began the 2010 season with the Clearwater Threshers of the Class A-Advanced Florida State League (FSL). He batted .263 with 4 home runs, 20 runs batted in (RBIs), 17 doubles, and 11 triples.

Toronto Blue Jays
On July 29, 2010, Gose, along with J. A. Happ and Jonathan Villar, was traded to the Houston Astros in exchange for Roy Oswalt and $12 million. Immediately after, he was traded to the Toronto Blue Jays for first baseman Brett Wallace. The Blue Jays had attempted to acquire Gose from the Phillies before, including in the Roy Halladay trade. They assigned him to the Dunedin Blue Jays of the FSL.

Gose was ranked by MLB.com in 2011 as the Blue Jays fifth-best prospect in the organization. In 2011, he played for the New Hampshire Fisher Cats of the Double-A Eastern League (EL). The Fisher Cats were EL champions and Gose scored the winning run in the championship game. He broke Darin Mastroianni's record for stolen bases in one season, finishing with 70 stolen bases and getting caught 15 times. He also hit 15 home runs. During the 2011–12 offseason, he played in the Venezuelan Winter League, batting .182 in 18 games.

Prior to the 2012 season, he was ranked as the 39th-best prospect in baseball. Gose started the 2012 season with the Las Vegas 51s of the Triple-A Pacific Coast League. He was named to appear in the 2012 All-Star Futures Game.  In Triple-A in 2012, Gose had a .286 average with 5 home runs, 21 doubles, 10 triples, and 43 runs batted in.

Gose played in 106 games in the 2013 season with the Buffalo Bisons in the International League, finishing with a .239 average, 3 home runs, and 27 RBIs in 393 at bats, along with 22 stolen bases in 35 attempts.

Major league career

On July 17, 2012, Gose was called up to the Blue Jays to replace the injured José Bautista. Gose made his MLB debut that day, against the New York Yankees. Gose collected his first Major League hit on a bunt single in the ninth inning off Clay Rapada. Gose made his first Major League start on July 18, playing right field and batting leadoff, going 0-for-3 with 2 strikeouts.

Gose was returned to Triple-A on August 25 when Brandon Morrow returned from the disabled list.  Gose was recalled by the Jays on September 4 when major league rosters expanded, and the Triple-A season ended. In a game on September 8, against the Boston Red Sox, Gose hit his first career home run, a three-run shot off reliever Andrew Bailey. Gose played in 56 games in the 2012 season, finishing with a .223 average, 1 home run, and 11 RBIs in 166 at bats, along with 15 stolen bases.

Gose was optioned to the Blue Jays' new Triple-A affiliate Buffalo Bisons on March 25, 2013. He was recalled by the Blue Jays on May 20. Mickey Storey was optioned to make room on the 25-man roster for Gose. Gose was optioned back to the Bisons on June 6. He was recalled on August 16. Gose played in 52 games in the 2013 season, finishing with a .259 average, .283 on base percentage, 2 home runs, and 12 RBIs in 147 at bats, along with 4 stolen bases in 7 attempts.

Gose was optioned to the Bisons on March 24, 2014.

Gose was up and down between Buffalo and Toronto for much of the 2014 season. After hitting .234 with one home run and 14 stolen bases with the big league team, Gose was optioned back to Buffalo on August 15 to make room for the returning Edwin Encarnación. He was brought back to the Blue Jays on September 1, as part of the September roster expansion.

Detroit Tigers
On November 12, 2014, Gose was traded to the Detroit Tigers for second baseman Devon Travis. In the 2015 season, he served as the Tigers primary centerfielder, playing in 140 games, and hit .254 with 23 stolen bases. On May 16, 2016, Gose was optioned to the Triple-A Toledo Mud Hens. Prior to being sent down, Gose batted .209 with two home runs and seven RBIs in 30 games for Detroit.

On July 9, 2016, Gose engaged in a dugout incident with Triple-A manager Lloyd McClendon. During the first game of a doubleheader, McClendon appeared to be giving "constructive criticism" to Gose, who responded in a negative fashion to these comments and allegedly swore at his manager. Gose was promptly sent home and did not play the remainder of the first game nor any of the second game. On July 10, 2016, Gose refused to show up for the game and had cleared out his locker.

On July 13, 2016, the Tigers decided they would demote Gose to their Double-A affiliate following a three-day suspension. "After collectively evaluating the situation in Toledo, we spoke with Anthony and emphasized our organization's expectations of him," said Tigers general manager Al Avila. "Most importantly, Anthony's transfer to Erie is a move to give him a fresh start to his overall performance as he works his way back to Detroit."

The Tigers designated Gose for assignment on January 18, 2017, to make room for Mikie Mahtook on the roster. On January 25, 2017, Gose cleared waivers and was outrighted to the Triple-A Toledo Mud Hens. On March 26, 2017, after sending Gose down to minor league camp, the Tigers announced that they would try to convert him into a pitcher after he came to them with the idea. Gose made his pitching debut on May 22 with the Lakeland Flying Tigers of the FSL, pitching an inning and reaching . He elected free agency on November 6, 2017.

Texas Rangers
On November 30, 2017, Gose signed a minor league deal with the Texas Rangers. Two weeks later on December 14, the Houston Astros selected Gose in the Rule 5 draft. On March 5, 2018, Gose was placed on outright waivers by the Astros who then returned him to the Rangers, where he was assigned to Triple-A. He declared free agency on October 5, 2018.

Cleveland Indians / Guardians
On December 8, 2018, Gose signed a minor-league contract with the Cleveland Indians. Gose was invited to Spring Training for 2020. He became a free agent on November 2, 2020. Gose signed a minor league deal with the Indians on November 17, 2020; the deal included an invitation to the Indians' 2021 major league spring training camp. Gose was assigned to the Indians’ taxi squad to begin the 2021 season.

The Indians selected Gose's contract on September 20, 2021.

Gose was designated for assignment on November 15, 2022. The Guardians declined to tender Gose a contract for the 2023 season by the non-tender deadline of November 18, 2022; Gose subsequently became a free agent.  On December 1, 2022, the Guardians re-signed Gose to a two-year minor league contract while he recovers from Tommy John surgery on his left elbow; the deal includes an invitation to the Guardians' 2023 major league spring training camp.

International career
In May 2021, Gose was named to the roster of the United States national baseball team for qualifying for baseball at the 2020 Summer Olympics. After the team qualified, he was named to the Olympics roster on July 2. The team went on to win silver, losing to hosts Japan in the gold medal game.

See also

 List of Olympic medalists in baseball

References

External links

1990 births
Living people
African-American baseball players
Akron RubberDucks players
American expatriate baseball players in Canada
Atenienses de Manatí (baseball) players
Baseball players at the 2020 Summer Olympics
Buffalo Bisons (minor league) players
Clearwater Threshers players
Cleveland Guardians players
Cleveland Indians players
Detroit Tigers players
Down East Wood Ducks players
Dunedin Blue Jays players
Erie SeaWolves players
Frisco RoughRiders players
Florida Complex League Phillies players
Lakewood BlueClaws players
Las Vegas 51s players
Liga de Béisbol Profesional Roberto Clemente outfielders
Liga de Béisbol Profesional Roberto Clemente pitchers
Lynchburg Hillcats players
Major League Baseball outfielders
Major League Baseball pitchers
New Hampshire Fisher Cats players
People from Bellflower, California
Phoenix Desert Dogs players
Tiburones de La Guaira players
American expatriate baseball players in Venezuela
Tigres de Aragua players
Toledo Mud Hens players
Toronto Blue Jays players
United States national baseball team players
Olympic baseball players of the United States
Medalists at the 2020 Summer Olympics
Olympic silver medalists for the United States in baseball
Columbus Clippers players
Lakeland Flying Tigers players
Toros del Este players
American expatriate baseball players in the Dominican Republic
21st-century African-American sportspeople